Isaac Meyer Marks (born 1935) was born in Cape Town, South Africa. He trained in medicine there, qualifying in 1956. His training as a psychiatrist began in 1960 at the University of London (at the Bethlem-Maudsley Hospital) and was completed in 1963.

Between 1964 and 2000 he conducted clinical research at the Institute of Psychiatry, University of London, and the Bethlem-Maudsley Hospital. He collaborated with the Chief Nursing Officer there, Eileen Skellern, to develop an innovative course for nurses in behavioural psychotherapy, which started in 1973. He became Honorary Consultant Psychiatrist at the Institute in 1968, and Professor of Experimental Psychopathology in 1978. In 2000 he became Professor Emeritus.

From 2000-2003 he ran a computer-aided self-help clinic at Imperial College, London, where he was a Visiting Professor. He is now also Honorary Professor at the Free University of Amsterdam.

Marks' research included the treatment of anxiety, phobic, obsessive-compulsive and sexual disorders; interactions between drugs and behavioral psychotherapy; development of a nurse behavioral psychotherapist training program (in relation to which he coined the term 'barefoot therapist', modelled on Mao Zedong's term Barefoot Doctor); community care of serious mental illness; health care and cost-effectiveness evaluation; and electroshock conversion therapy. He has developed computer aids both to evaluate treatment outcome and for self-help - matters which continue to be a central interest.

He was also instrumental in the creation of the self-help organisation Triumph Over Phobia and was a founding member of the BABCP.  He is married to Shula Marks.

Writings
Living with Fear: Understanding and Coping with Anxiety (1978) 
Cure and Care of Neuroses (1988) 
The Practice of Behavioural and Cognitive Psychotherapy (foreword) (1991) 
Hands-on Help: Computer-aided Psychotherapy (2007) 
Fears, Phobias, and Rituals: Panic, Anxiety, and Their Disorders (1987)

References

1935 births
Living people
British psychiatrists
British Jews
British self-help writers
Alumni of the University of London
Writers from Cape Town
South African emigrants to the United Kingdom
South African Jews
Fellows of the Royal College of Psychiatrists
Academics of the University of London